Christian Cambon (born 8 March 1948) is a French politician of the Republicans (LR) who has been serving as a member of the Senate since 2004, representing the Val-de-Marne department.

Early life and education 
Cambon graduated from the Paris Institute of Political Studies (Sciences Po) and holds a Master's degree in Public Law (Panthéon-Assas University).

Political career 
Cambon has been the Mayor of Saint-Maurice (Val-de-Marne) since 1989 and Senior Vice-Chairman of the Syndicat des eaux d’Ile-de-France (public drinking water service for the greater metropolitan Paris area)

In the Senate, Cambon serves as chairman of the Committee on Foreign Affairs, Defense and Armed Forces. He also chairs the French-Moroccan Parliamentary Friendship Group and the French delegation to the NATO Parliamentary Assembly.

Other activities 
 French Development Agency (AFD), Member of the Board of Directors

References

Page on the Senate website

1948 births
Living people
The Republicans (France) politicians
French Senators of the Fifth Republic
Mayors of places in Île-de-France
Paris 2 Panthéon-Assas University alumni
Sciences Po alumni
People from Saint-Mandé
Senators of Val-de-Marne
Politicians from Île-de-France